An intensity-duration-frequency curve (IDF curve) is a mathematical function that relates the rainfall intensity with its duration and frequency of occurrence. These curves are commonly used in hydrology for flood forecasting and civil engineering for urban drainage design. However, the IDF curves are also analysed in hydrometeorology because of the interest in the time concentration or time-structure of the rainfall. Additionally, Heidari et al., (2020) recently developed IDF curves for drought events

Mathematical approaches 

The IDF curves can take different mathematical expressions, theoretical or empirically fitted to observed rainfall data. For each duration (e.g. 5, 10, 60, 120, 180 ... minutes), the empirical cumulative distribution function (ECDF), and a determined frequency or return period is set. Therefore, the empirical IDF curve is given by the union of the points of equal frequency of occurrence and different duration and intensity Likewise, a theoretical or semi-empirical IDF curve is one whose mathematical expression is physically justified, but presents parameters that must be estimated by empirical fits.

Empirical approaches 

There is a large number of empirical approaches that relate the intensity (I), the duration (t) and the return period (p), from fits to power laws such as:

 Sherman's formula, with three parameters (a, c and n), which are a function of the return period, p:
 
 Chow's formula, also with three parameters (a, c and n), for a particular return period p:
 
 Power law according to Aparicio (1997),  with four parameters (a, c, m and n), already adjusted for all return periods of interest:  
 

In hydrometeorology, the simple power law (taking ) is used according to Monjo (2016) as a measure of the time-structure of the rainfall:
 
where  is defined as an intensity of reference for a fixed time , i.e. In a rainfall event, the equivalent to the IDF curve is called Maximum Averaged Intensity (MAI) curve.

Theoretical approaches 

 

 Power law with the return period, derived from the Pareto distribution, for a fixed duration :

 

where the Pareto distribution constant has been redefined as, since it is a valid distribution for a specific duration of precipitation, it has been taken as.

 Function derived from the generalized Pareto distribution, for a given duration :

 

However, with  the exponential distribution is retrieved.

Function deduced from the Gumbel distribution and the opposite Gumbel distribution, for a given duration :

References 

Empirical process
Mathematical analysis
Hydrology and urban planning